Paul Leitch (born 19 April 1963) is a New Zealand cyclist. He competed at the 1988 Summer Olympics and the 1992 Summer Olympics.

References

External links
 

1963 births
Living people
New Zealand male cyclists
Olympic cyclists of New Zealand
Cyclists at the 1988 Summer Olympics
Cyclists at the 1992 Summer Olympics
Cyclists from Auckland
Commonwealth Games medallists in cycling
Commonwealth Games silver medallists for New Zealand
Commonwealth Games bronze medallists for New Zealand
Cyclists at the 1986 Commonwealth Games
Cyclists at the 1994 Commonwealth Games
20th-century New Zealand people
Medallists at the 1986 Commonwealth Games
Medallists at the 1994 Commonwealth Games